Zhang Jike successfully defended the title by defeating Wang Hao 11–7, 11–8, 6–11, 14–12, 5–11, 11–7 in the final.

Seeds
Singles matches were best of 7 games in qualification matches and best of 7 games in the 128-player sized main draw.

  Xu Xin (semifinals)
  Ma Long (semifinals)
  Wang Hao (final)
  Zhang Jike (champion)
  Timo Boll (quarterfinals)
  Chuang Chih-yuan (fourth round)
  Dimitrij Ovtcharov (fourth round)
  Ma Lin (second round)
  Jun Mizutani (first round)
  Vladimir Samsonov (fourth round)
  Yan An (quarterfinals)
  Jiang Tianyi (first round)
  Gao Ning (fourth round)
  Adrian Crișan (second round)
  Koki Niwa (fourth round)
  Marcos Freitas (fourth round)
  Bastian Steger (second round)
  Adrien Mattenet (second round)
  Chen Chien-an (third round)
  Patrick Baum (quarterfinals)
  Tang Peng (third round)
  Taku Takakiwa (second round)
  Seiya Kishikawa (fourth round)
  Robert Gardos (fourth round)
  Chen Weixing (second round)
  Kim Min-Seok (second round)
  Fan Zhendong (third round)
  Kazuhiro Chan (third round)
  Andrej Gaćina (third round)
  Tiago Apolónia (third round)
  Kim Hyok-Bong  (first round)
  Jung Young-Sik (second round)
  Lee Sang-Su (second round)
  Werner Schlager (second round)
  Noshad Alamian (third round)
  Kirill Skachkov (second round)
  Bojan Tokič (third round)
  Cazuo Matsumoto (second round)
  Panagiotis Gionis (second round)
  Kenta Matsudaira (quarterfinals)
  Seo Hyun-Deok (first round)
  Alexey Smirnov (third round)
  Patrick Franziska (second round)
  João Monteiro (second round)
  Cho Eon-Rae (third round)
  Leung Chu Yan (second round)
  Jens Lundqvist (third round)
  Cheung Yuk (second round)
  Sharath Kamal (second round)
  Kalinikos Kreanga (third round)
  Emmanuel Lebesson (third round)
  Pär Gerell (second round)
  He Zhi Wen (third round)
  El-sayed Lashin (first round)
  Daniel Gorak (first round)
  Gustavo Tsuboi (second round)
  Daniel Habesohn (second round)
  Bora Vang (first round)
  Zoran Primorac (second round)
  Stefan Fegerl (second round)
  Mihai Bobocica (first round)
  Damien Éloi (second round)
  Ádám Pattantyús (second round)
  Wang Zengyi (second round)

Draw

Finals

Top half

Section 1

Section 2

Section 3

Section 4

Bottom half

Section 5

Section 6

Section 7

Section 8

References

External links
Main Draw

Men's singles